Nicholas Walter Lyell, Baron Lyell of Markyate, PC, QC (6 December 1938 – 30 August 2010) was an English Conservative politician, known for much of his active political career as Sir Nicholas Lyell.

Early life
Born in London, he was the son of High Court judge Sir Maurice Lyell, and sculptor/designer Veronica Luard, the daughter of Lowes Luard, a contemporary of Augustus John and Walter Sickert. His mother died when he was 11, leaving Lyell and his sister Prue to continue their mother's work to preserve the work of their grandfather.

Educated at Wellesley House School in the coastal town of Broadstairs in Kent and at Stowe School, he was his father's best man when he married the also widowed Kitty, Lady Farrar, younger daughter of Walter Runciman, 1st Viscount Runciman of Doxford. Lyell read modern history at Christ Church, Oxford, where he joined the Bullingdon club, and after National Service with the Royal Artillery trained as a lawyer.

Legal career
Lyell trained with the firm associated with his stepmother's family, Walter Runciman and Co, and was called to the bar at Inner Temple in 1965. He served his pupillage with Gordon Slynn, and after being part of the team that debated a case over the world's first onion-peeling machine, specialised in commercial and public law.

Political career
After unsuccessfully contesting Lambeth Central in October 1974, Lyell was elected Member of Parliament for Hemel Hempstead winning the seat from Labour in 1979, then Mid Bedfordshire from 1983, and moved to North East Bedfordshire at the 1997 election, having been defeated for the nomination by former Bristol MP Jonathan Sayeed in the Mid Bedfordshire constituency.

Lyell was one of very few lawyers to have combined a successful career in Parliament and a major private practice.  He was also the longest continuously serving law officer for more than 100 years. After 20 years at the Bar he was appointed Solicitor-General from 1987 to 1992 under Margaret Thatcher, during which time he appeared in the Factortame case, and Attorney General for England and Wales and Northern Ireland under John Major from 1992 to 1997. He was knighted in 1987. He stood down as an MP at the 2001 election.

Commenting on Lyell's retirement as an MP, Conservative Party chairman Michael Ancram said:

Matrix Churchill affair

Lyell was at the centre of the Matrix Churchill affair, the controversy to sell arms to Saddam Hussein's Iraq. In 1996, the Scott Report directly criticised Lyell as Attorney General for trying to obtain a "gagging order" to prevent the disclosure of secret documents concerning machine tool and material supply to Baghdad. Prime Minister John Major chose to stand by Lyell.

Peerage
On 13 May 2005, it was announced that he would be created a life peer, and on 27 June 2005 he was created Baron Lyell of Markyate, of Markyate in the County of Hertfordshire.

Other interests
Lyell was a former chairman of the board of Governors of Stowe School, standing down from the role at the end of the 2006–7 academic year. Always interested in the countryside and culture, he was from 2005 Chairman of the Federation of British Artists at the Mall Galleries in London.

Lyell was an underwriting 'Name' at the Lloyd's of London insurance market. He joined in 1974 but suffered enormous losses in the bad years 1989 – 1992 as a result of the Piper Alpha oil rig disaster in 1988 and the tsunami of claims from asbestos-related Mesothelioma personal injury. His losses have variously been estimated to be between £622,591 and £2,000,000; he underwrote on numerous syndicates.

Personal life
Married to Susanna, the couple had two sons and two daughters. Lyell died in the Hospice of St Francis in Berkhamsted, Herts after a 12-year battle with cancer on 30 August 2010.

References

External links 
 

|-

|-

|-

|-

|-

|-

1938 births
2010 deaths
Alumni of Christ Church, Oxford
Attorneys General for England and Wales
Attorneys General for Northern Ireland
English King's Counsel
Deaths from cancer in England
Conservative Party (UK) life peers
Conservative Party (UK) MPs for English constituencies
Lawyers from London
Members of the Privy Council of the United Kingdom
Northern Ireland Government ministers
People educated at Stowe School
Politicians from London
Politics of Dacorum
20th-century King's Counsel
Solicitors General for England and Wales
UK MPs 1979–1983
UK MPs 1983–1987
UK MPs 1987–1992
UK MPs 1992–1997
UK MPs 1997–2001
People from Markyate
20th-century English lawyers
Knights Bachelor
Life peers created by Elizabeth II
Politicians awarded knighthoods